The 1927 Texas Tech Matadors football team represented Texas Technological College—now known as Texas Tech University—as an independent during the 1927 college football season. In their third season under head coach Ewing Y. Freeland, the Matadors compiled a 5–4 record and outscored opponents by a combined total of 134 to 100. The team played its home games at Tech Field.

Schedule

References

Texas Tech
Texas Tech Red Raiders football seasons
Texas Tech Matadors football